Marripuri Suresh (born 21 December 1983) is an Indian first-class cricketer who plays for Andhra Pradesh.

References

External links
 

1983 births
Living people
Indian cricketers
Andhra cricketers
People from Kadapa
Cricketers from Andhra Pradesh